Gaustatoppen is the highest mountain in the county Vestfold og Telemark in Norway which lies in the municipality Tinn and Hjartdal. The view from the summit is impressive, as one can see an area of approximately 60,000 km², one sixth of Norway's mainland.  The mountain is popular for downhill skiing in winter, and competitions have been held on its slopes. These competitions include the "Norseman triathlon", billed as "the world's most brutal iron-distance triathlon". It starts in Eidfjord and finishes at the top of Gaustatoppen. The summit is accessible on foot in the summer, on a rocky pathway of medium difficulty, although the southern side of the mountain is very dangerous and inaccessible. The wreckage of an airplane crash lies there, as it is too difficult to remove it.

The name
The first element is Gausta, the name of the whole mountain, the last element is the finite form of topp m 'top, summit'. The name Gausta is probably a shortened form for *Gaustafjell (Gausta mountain), because Gausta originally was the name of a farm beneath the mountain. (For the same development see Dovre.) The Old Norse form of the name was maybe *Gautstǫð, the name is then a compound of gaut f 'flooded place', and stǫð f 'stead, landing place for boat'. (The farm lies at Rjukan river.)

Railway
There is a funicular railway inside the mountain, built for military purposes. This ascends from the base of the mountain almost to the summit. A short railway takes the passengers from the mountain base horizontally to the lower station deep inside the mountain. It was built to access the military radio relay station built at and inside the mountain top. The installation is now a tourist attraction. It was financed mainly by American military grants, and cost one million US dollars to build from 1954 to 1959.

Gausta skicenter
Gausta skicenter is a merge of two small alpine ski areas (Gaustatoppen Skisenter and Gaustablikk Skisenter) with further expansion of slopes. As of 2019 it has 45 km of slopes and 550 metres height difference. Located 180 km by road from Oslo, it aims to be one of the major ski areas of Norway.

Gallery

See also

 List of highest points of Norwegian counties

References

External links 
 Rjukan Tourist Information
 Norseman Xtreme Triathlon
 Tommy Sørbø. Å vanhellige et hellig fjell [To profane a sacred mountain] (15 January 2021)
 
 

Tinn
Highest points of Norwegian counties
Mountains of Vestfold og Telemark